Sir James Boyton  (1855 – 16 May 1926) was a British estate agent and a Conservative politician.

Boyton was born in Shoreditch, London, to Henry and Sarah Boyton. He joined his family firm of Elliott, Son and Boyton in 1878. He was president of the Auctioneers' and Estate Agents' Institute for 1905–6. He also served as a Justice of the peace (JP) for the County of London.

Boyton was a member of the London County Council from 1907 to 1910, representing the Municipal Reform Party. Successfully contesting both the January 1910 parliamentary election and the December 1910 election, he was Unionist Member of Parliament (MP) for Marylebone East from 1910 to 1918. Boyton was knighted in the 1918 New Year Honours.

His only son, Henry James Boyton, was killed on 14 December 1916 during the Battle of the Somme.

References

External links 
 

1855 births
1926 deaths
Knights Bachelor
Politicians awarded knighthoods
Conservative Party (UK) MPs for English constituencies
UK MPs 1910
UK MPs 1910–1918
Members of London County Council
British estate agents (people)
People from Shoreditch
Date of birth missing